Anders Bjørgaard (18 March 1891 – 20 March 1967) was a Norwegian illustrator.

He is particularly known for drawing the comic series Jens von Bustenskjold (with text by Sigurd Lybeck), which appeared in Arbeidermagasinet from 1934 to 1970. A memorial of Bjørgaard was raised in 1970.

Personal life
Bjørgaard was born in Holtålen to Johanna Bjørgaard and Anders Bjørgaard. He was married to Johanne Sofie Olsen. He worked as a miner until 1919, when he started studying at the Norwegian National Academy of Craft and Art Industry in Kristiania.

References

1891 births
1967 deaths
People from Holtålen
Oslo National Academy of the Arts alumni
Norwegian comics writers
Norwegian illustrators